Sir Thomas Bendysh, 2nd Baronet (c.1607–1674), served as the English ambassador to the Ottoman sultanate in the mid-17th century.

Life
Son of Sir Thomas Bendish, 1st Baronet of Bower Hall, Steeple Bumpstead, Essex, Bendish the younger enrolled in Middle Temple in 1626, after earlier studying at St John's College, Cambridge. Later in life, he donated fifty books to St John's, of which forty are still kept today.

Sir Thomas succeeded to the Baronetcy in 1636. A decade later he was banned from Essex, had his estates seized, and was imprisoned in the Tower of London after siding with King Charles I during the English Civil War. He was released on 28 September 1644, after paying a 1,000 pound fine, although he remained banned from coming within 20 miles of Essex.

Bendysh was appointed on 8 January 1647. On 29 January 1647 the House of Lords confirmed that Sir Thomas was named as ambassador to the Ottoman Empire. A Royal Commission set up by parliament followed on 1 February. Bendysh received articles with the Levant Company from 18 March, set sail and arrived in Constantinople by 26 September. Upon his entrance to Constantinople (now Istanbul) he was confronted by the previous ambassador, who refused to relinquish his post, and had to be forcibly removed from office.

While in office, it is known that Sir Thomas personally saw to Isaac Barrow. He was imprisoned by the Ottomans at one point due to a commercial dispute with clerics.

Bendysh was recalled from his post some time before 1655 but he continued to offer his services without commission.  He was recalled by Cromwell's Protectorate at the Restoration on 25 June 1660.  However, in light of the changing political situation, he delayed his departure until 11 March 1661.

He died at his home in Bower Hall in 1674.  He was succeeded by son and heir Sir John Bendish, 3rd Baronet (1630–1707).

Family
Sir Thomas's wife Anne, the daughter of Henry Baker, died before 1661 in Constantinople and was buried at Steeple Bumstead.

See also
 List of baronetcies in the Baronetage of England: Bendish of Steeple Bumpstead, created 1611, extinct 1717.

Notes

References
Anderson, James. Memorable women of the Puritan times, Volume 2, Blackie and son, 1862.

Further reading
Oliver Cromwell's letter to Sultan Han, mention of Bendish
 

1607 births
1674 deaths
Ambassadors of England to the Ottoman Empire
Baronets in the Baronetage of England
Alumni of St John's College, Cambridge
17th-century English diplomats
People from Steeple Bumpstead